The 2016–17 season in Primera División de Nicaragua will be divided into two tournaments (Apertura and Clausura) and will determine the 69th and 70th champions in the history of the league. The Apertura tournament will be played in the second half of 2016, while the Clausura will be played in the first half of 2017.

Format
The Apertura play-off format was changed from previous years, while the Clausura will use the same 4-team play-off format. For the Apetura, the top four teams from the regular stage advanced to a "quadrangular" double-round robin instead of a play-off stage. The regular stage and quadrangular winners would have played to decide the tournament's champion, but ultimately the same team won both and the final was not necessary. The same format was recently adopted by the Costa Rican Primera División, but for both half season.

Teams

A total of 10 teams will contest the league, including 8 sides from the 2015–16 season and one sids directly promoted from the 2015–16 Segunda division. The final participant will be determined in a two-legged play-off, in which the 9th placed Primera division side ART Jalapa will play the team who finished second in Segunda division which was Sebaco. Sebaco won 4-3 on aggregate over ART Jalapa which meant they were promoted in the Primera Division.

 Deportivo Sebaco (Runner-up of the Segunda Division)
 Diriangén FC
 Juventus Managua
 Managua F.C.
 Nandasmo F.C. (Winner of the Segunda Division)
 Real Madriz
 Real Estelí F.C.
 UNAN Managua
 Chinandega FC 
 Deportivo Walter Ferretti

Promotion and relegation
 At the end of the 2015–16, Nandasmo F.C. and Deportivo Sebaco was promoted to Primera Division
 At the end of the 2015–16, Deportivo Ocotal and ART Jalapa was relegated to Segunda Division.

Apertura

Personnel and sponsoring (2016 Apertura)

Managerial Changes

Before the season

During the season

Regular season
The regular season began on 2016. The top four finishers will move on to the next stage of the competition.

Scoring
First goal of the season:  Rodrigo Valiente for Deportivo Walter Ferretti against UNAN Managua , 51 minutes (6 August 2016)
First goal by a foreign player:  Rodrigo Valiente for Deportivo Walter Ferretti against UNAN Managua , 51 minutes (6 August 2016)
Fastest goal in a match: 2 minutes
 Remy Vanegas for Diriangen FC against Nandasmo F.C. (28 September 2016)
Goal scored at the latest point in a match: 93 minutes
 Anderson Acosta for Deportivo Sebaco against Chinandega FC (17 August 2016)
First penalty Kick of the season:  Rodrigo Valiente for Deportivo Walter Ferretti against UNAN Managua , 51 minutes (6 August 2016)
Widest winning margin: 10 goals
Juventus Managua 10–0 Nandasmo F.C. (26 October 2016)
First hat-trick of the season:  Rudel Calero for Real Estelí F.C. against Nandasmo F.C. (21 September 2016)
First own goal of the season:  Felix Rodriguez for UNAN Managua against Deportivo Walter Ferretti (21 September 2016)
Most goals in a match: 11 goals
Real Madriz 8–3 Nandasmo F.C. (4 September 2016)
Most goals by one team in a match: 10 goals
Juventus Managua 10–0 Nandasmo F.C. (26 October 2016)
Most goals in one half by one team: 7 goals
Juventus Managua 10–0 Nandasmo F.C. (26 October 2016)
Most goals scored by losing team: 3 goals
Real Madriz 8–3 Nandasmo F.C. (4 September 2016)
Most goals by one player in a single match: 4 goals
 Rudel Calero for Real Estelí F.C. against Nandasmo F.C. (21 September 2016)

Standings

Results

Positions by round

Championship group

Standings

Results

List of foreign players in the league
This is a list of foreign players in Apertura 2016. The following players:
have played at least one apertura game for the respective club.
have not been capped for the Nicaragua national football team on any level, independently from the birthplace

A new rule was introduced this year, that clubs can only have five foreign players in a squad.

Chinandega ✔
  Marlon Barrios 
  Bryan Cañate
  Richard Junior Charris
  Johan Hurtado
  Yosimar Rivera
  Christian Izaguirre

Diriangén ✔
  Lucas Martella
  Rafael Vieira
  Erick Alcázar
  Armando Valdéz Caicedo
  Leonel Escoto

Juventus Managua ✔
  Jose Pereira da Silva
  Jorge Betancur
  Deybran Blanco
  Juan Esteban Ospina
  Juan Diego Uribe

Managua ✔
  Christiano da Lima
  Marlon Barrios
  Darwing Güity
  Arán Pazos Balado
  Genlis Piñero

Nandasmo
  Cristian Ortega
  Willer Alexander Rodriguez

 (player released mid season)

Real Estelí ✔
  Juan Berdún
  Jonatas Ribeiro
  Maycon Santana 
  Jonathan Mosquera
  Emilio López
  Gregorio Torres

Real Madriz ✔
  Eduardo Salas
  Marel Steven Álvarez
  Luis Valladarez
  Edward Morillo
  Karim Nasser

Sebaco
  Evaristo González
  Bryan Leal
  Andrés Solarte

UNAN Managua ✔
  Jonathan Donado
  Luis Fernándo González
  John Hernandez
  Rodrigo Hernandez
  Renan Lalin

Walter Ferretti ✔
  Robinson Luiz da Silva
  Pedro Augusto dos Santos Sousa
  Allan Gutiérrez
  Bernardo Laureiro
  Rodrigo Valiente

Top goalscorers

Clausura

Personnel and sponsoring (2017 Clausura)

Managerial Changes

Before the season

During the season

Regular season
The regular season began on 2017. The top four finishers will move on to the next stage of the competition.

Scoring
First goal of the season:  Bismarck Montiel for Managua F.C. against UNAN Managua , 29 minutes (27 January 2017)
Fastest goal in a match: 2 minutes
 Alexis Chavez for Juventus Managua against Managua F.C. (3 February 2017)
Goal scored at the latest point in a match: 94 minutes
 Alonso Umaña for Chinandega FC against Deportivo Walter Ferretti (11 March 2017)
First Penalty kick of the season:  Bismarck Montiel for Managua F.C. against UNAN Managua , 29 minutes (27 January 2017)
Widest winning margin: 8 goals
UNAN Managua 10–2 Nandasmo F.C. (8 March 2017)
First hat-trick of the season:  Gregorio Torres for Real Estelí F.C. against Nandasmo F.C. (11 February 2017)
First own goal of the season:  Juan Narváez for Diriangén FC against Deportivo Walter Ferretti (12 February 2017)
Most goals in a match: 12 goals
UNAN Managua 10–2 Nandasmo F.C. (8 March 2017)
Most goals by one team in a match: 10 goals
UNAN Managua 10–2 Nandasmo F.C. (8 March 2017)
Most goals in one half by one team: 6 goals
UNAN Managua 10–2 Nandasmo F.C. (8 March 2017)
Most goals scored by losing team: 2 goals
UNAN Managua 10–2 Nandasmo F.C. (8 March 2017)
Most goals by one player in a single match: 4 goals
 Daniel Reyes for UNAN Managua against Nandasmo F.C. (8 March 2017)

Standings

Results

Positions by round

Playoffs

Semi-finals

Finals

List of foreign players in the league
This is a list of foreign players in Clausura 2017. The following players:
have played at least one apertura game for the respective club.
have not been capped for the Nicaragua national football team on any level, independently from the birthplace

A new rule was introduced this year, that clubs can only have five foreign players in a squad.

Chinandega ✔
  Erwin Cabrera
  Bryan Cañate
  Yosimar Rivera
  Alonso Umaña
  Christian Izaguirre

Diriangén 
  Erick Alcázar
  Miguel Estrada
  Armando Valdéz Caicedo
  Arlis Andino

Juventus Managua
  Deybran Blanco
  Juan Esteban Ospina
  Juan Diego Uribe
  Kenneth Carvajal

Managua
  Christiano da Lima
  Thiago Lima da Silva
  Marlon Barrios
  Francisco Miranda

Nandasmo
  Cristian Ortega
  Camilo Quiñonez
  Willer Alexander Rodriguez
  Yilmar Salas

 (player released mid season)

Real Estelí ✔
  José Vagno Fontes dos Santos
  Vitinho
  Gerardo Aguilar
  Juan Carlos López
  Gregorio Torres

Real Madriz ✔
  Marel Steven Álvarez
  Grodbin Antonio Benítez Aguilar
  Edwin Castro
  Luis Valladarez
  Edward Morillo

Sebaco ✔
  Rodrigo de Brito
  Axel Oyeras
  Juan Sánchez
  Jorge Darío Florentín
  Miguel Leonardo Sosa González

UNAN Managua ✔
  Rodrigo Hernández
  Óscar Palomino
  Renan Lalin
  Luis Martínez Rangel
  Ever Benítez

Walter Ferretti ✔
  Robinson Luiz da Silva
  Pedro Augusto dos Santos Sousa
  Eder Munive
  Allan Gutiérrez
  Bernardo Laureiro

Top goalscorers

Championship playoff
As the winners of both the Apertura and Clausura tournaments, Real Estelí were declared the season champions without a playoff. It is their 14th league title.

Aggregate table

Relegation playoff
The ninth place team in the aggregate table, Sebaco, played a two-leg playoff against the second place team from the Segunda División de Nicaragua, San Francisco, for one spot in next season's Primera División.

San Francisco won 3-2 on aggregate and are promoted to the Primera División. Sebaco are relegated to the Segunda División.

External links
 https://int.soccerway.com/national/nicaragua/1a-division/2015-2016/apertura/

Nicaraguan Primera División seasons
1
Nicaragua